Helen Elliot (20 January 1927 – 12 January 2013)
was an international table tennis player from Scotland.

Table tennis career
Helen started playing table tennis aged 16. In 1946 she won the first of 13 consecutive Scottish Open women's singles titles and was capped by Scotland the following year.
From 1948 to 1957 she won seven medals in the World Table Tennis Championships.

The seven medals included two golds at the 1949 World Table Tennis Championships and 1950 World Table Tennis Championships in the women's doubles where she partnered Gizi Farkas and Dora Beregi respectively.

She also won two English Open titles.

Personal life
She coached at Butlins Holiday Camps with Johnny Leach. She married and became Helen Hamilton-Elliot and was President of the Commonwealth Table Tennis Federation.

See also
 List of table tennis players
 List of World Table Tennis Championships medalists

References

1927 births
2013 deaths
British female table tennis players
Scottish table tennis players